Jesús Limardo (born 29 February 1996) is a Venezuelan épée fencer. He won the silver medal in the men's épée event at the 2019 Pan American Games held in Lima, Peru. His older brother Rubén Limardo won the gold medal.

References

External links 
 

Living people
1996 births
Place of birth missing (living people)
Venezuelan male épée fencers
Pan American Games silver medalists for Venezuela
Pan American Games medalists in fencing
Medalists at the 2019 Pan American Games
Fencers at the 2019 Pan American Games
Central American and Caribbean Games gold medalists for Venezuela
Competitors at the 2018 Central American and Caribbean Games
Central American and Caribbean Games medalists in fencing
21st-century Venezuelan people